Joe Hogan is an American politician. A Republican, he is a member of the Pennsylvania House of Representatives representing the 142nd legislative district since 2023.

Political career 
Hogan ran for the 142nd PA House seat in 2023 to replace Frank Farry, who was running for the Pennsylvania State Senate. Hogan won election by only 53 votes.

References 

Living people
Year of birth missing (living people)
Republican Party members of the Pennsylvania House of Representatives

Politicians from Bucks County, Pennsylvania
Pennsylvania State University alumni
21st-century American politicians